Gaël Monfils was the defending champion, but lost to wildcard Patrik Rosenholm in the first round.
Tomáš Berdych won the title, defeating Jo-Wilfried Tsonga 4–6, 6–4, 6–4 in the final.

Seeds
The first four seeds received a bye into the second round.

Draw

Finals

Top half

Bottom half

Qualifying

Seeds

Qualifiers

Draw

First qualifier

Second qualifier

Third qualifier

Fourth qualifier

References
 Main Draw
 Qualifying Draw

Singles